Station Eleven is a novel by the Canadian writer Emily St. John Mandel. It takes place in the Great Lakes region before and after a fictional swine flu pandemic, known as the "Georgia Flu,” has devastated the world, killing most of the population. The book was published in 2014, and won the Arthur C. Clarke Award the following year.

The novel was well received by critics, with the understated nature of Mandel's writing receiving particular praise. It appeared on several best-of-year lists.   it had sold 1.5 million copies.

A ten-part television adaptation of the same name premiered on HBO Max in December 2021.

The book was selected for the 2023 edition of Canada Reads, where it will be championed by Michael Greyeyes.<ref>"Meet the Canada Reads 2023 contenders". CBC Books, January 25, 2023.</ref>

Plot summary
During a production of King Lear at the Elgin Theatre in Toronto, Jeevan watches as the actor playing Lear, Arthur Leander, has a heart attack. Since he has begun training as a paramedic, Jeevan tries to resuscitate Arthur, but is unsuccessful. Instead, Jeevan comforts one of the child actors in the production, Kirsten. After leaving the play, Jeevan goes for a walk in the snow and receives a call from a friend who is a doctor in Toronto. He warns Jeevan to get out of the city as the mysterious Georgia Flu is spreading rapidly and will soon become a full-blown pandemic. Jeevan loads up on supplies and goes to stay with his brother, Frank. Many of the actors, actresses, and others that had gathered to mourn Arthur's death die within the next three weeks.

Twenty years later, Kirsten is part of a nomadic group of actors and musicians known as the Travelling Symphony. Kirsten, who was eight at the time of the outbreak, can remember little of her life before Year Zero, but clings to a two-volume set of graphic novels given to her by Arthur before his death, titled Station Eleven. The troupe operates on a two-year cycle touring the Great Lakes region, performing Shakespeare plays and classical music, while Kirsten scavenges abandoned homes for props, costumes, and traces of Arthur in tabloid magazines.

The troupe intends to reunite with two members they left behindthe pregnant Charlie, and her husband, Jeremyat a small town. Upon arriving, they are disturbed to find that their friends are missing, and the town is now under the control of the Prophet, who rapes the young girls he claims as his "wives". The troupe quickly leaves, and goes off-route to the Museum of Civilization, a settlement where they believe they might find their missing friends. En route, they discover a young stowaway who fled the town, as she was promised to the Prophet as another bride. Shortly after, members of the troupe begin to disappear until finally the entire troupe is gone, leaving only Kirsten and her friend August. Frightened, they continue on to the Museum, hoping to be reunited with others.

Unbeknownst to Kirsten, Station Eleven is an unpublished passion project by Arthur's first wife, Miranda. Fourteen years before the collapse of civilization, Miranda left an abusive relationship and married Arthur, a friend from her hometown in coastal British Columbia who has since become famous. As Arthur's fame as an actor hit its peak, Miranda realized he was having an affair with the woman who would become his second wife, Elizabeth. The night that Miranda discovers the affair, she walks out of her home and asks a paparazzo outside if he has a cigarette. The paparazzo turns out to be Jeevan. Years later, when Jeevan is trying to reinvent himself as an entertainment journalist, Arthur gives him an exclusive interview; he is leaving Elizabeth and their young son, Tyler, to be with another woman. Jeevan reflects on this while he and Frank are quarantining in Frank's apartment. After weeks, they realize that no one is coming to save them. Frank, who is paraplegic, dies by suicide to spare Jeevan from feeling responsible for him. Jeevan embarks on a journey south, and after many years, finds a new settlement where he marries and becomes the town doctor.

In Year Zero, one of Arthur's friends, Clark, informs Elizabeth that Arthur is dead. Clark, Elizabeth and Tyler happen to be on the same flight from New York City to Toronto to attend Arthur's funeral, until it is grounded at the Severn City Airport due to the pandemic. The passengers, having nowhere to go, create a settlement in the airport, and Clark becomes the "curator" of the Museum of Civilization, where he gathers artifacts such as iPhones and laptop computers. While most of the airport survivors adapt to their new life, Elizabeth and Tyler embrace religious zealotry, believing that the pandemic happened for a reason and spared those who were good. After two years, they leave with a religious cult.

In the present, Kirsten and August find a group of the Prophet's men holding Sayid, a member of their troupe, hostage. They kill the men and free Sayid, who explains that their friend Dieter was killed, while another hostage escaped, warned the troupe, and sent them on another road, explaining how they went missing. The trio leave for the Severn City Airport, but Kirsten is soon discovered by the Prophet. Just before he is about to kill her, he refers to the "Undersea," a place from the Station Eleven comics. Kirsten quotes lines from Station Eleven, distracting the Prophet long enough that a younger sentry (having a crisis of faith) shoots and kills him, before taking his own life. The trio continues to the Museum of Civilization, where they are reunited with Charlie, Jeremy and the rest of the troupe. Clark, who has lived in the museum for twenty years, realizes who Kirsten is, her attachment to Arthur, and that the Prophet was Tyler Leander. Clark takes Kirsten up to the control tower of the airport, where through a telescope he shows her there is a town to the south with electric lights, suggesting that civilization is beginning to take root again.

Five weeks later, Kirsten leaves with the Travelling Symphony for the town to the south. She gives one copy of Station Eleven to Clark's museum. He begins to read it and recognizes a scene that is borrowed from a dinner party which he, Arthur and Miranda once attended.

Main characters
Kirsten Raymonde – A former child actor from Toronto who is eight when the Georgia Flu destroys her world. Initially she and her brother are the only survivors in her family, but as they travel, he dies too. She joins the Travelling Symphony as a teenager and becomes obsessed with actor Arthur Leander, whose death she witnessed as a child.
Arthur Leander – A wildly successful film actor originally from the (fictional) Delano Island in British Columbia. Despite his success, Arthur is shiftless, unhappy, and marries three times. He dies onstage of a heart attack portraying King Lear at age 51, the same night the pandemic takes hold.
Jeevan Chaudhary – A former paparazzo, turned entertainment journalist, turned EMT, whose life intersects with Leander's at key moments.
Frank Chaudhary – Jeevan's paraplegic brother, a former combat reporter wounded in Afghanistan, now a ghostwriter who lives a life of solitude in his apartment.
Miranda Carroll – Arthur's first wife, eleven years his junior. She is initially an artist who is obsessed with creating her graphic novel, Station Eleven, about Dr. Eleven, a man who lives on a defunct planetary space station. She later becomes a proficient businesswoman. Shortly before Arthur's death, Miranda gives him two copies of the finally-completed graphic novel, which Arthur gives to his son, Tyler, and then-child Kirsten. Mandel has said Miranda is the character she most identifies with.
Clark Thompson – Arthur's English best friend, whom he met while they were struggling actors. He then works as a corporate businessman, and post-collapse, reinvents himself as a curator to a museum of obsolete objects.
Tyler Leander – The son of Arthur and his second wife Elizabeth. He grows up in Jerusalem, estranged from his father, and is later stranded in the settlement at the (fictional) Severn City Airport. He and his mother eventually leave with a religious cult, and he grows up to be the religious leader known as the Prophet.

Genre
Although many publications classified the novel as science fiction, Mandel does not believe that the work belongs to that genre, as the novel does not include any instances of fictional technology. She said the issue of labeling her work science fiction (as opposed to literary fiction) has followed her through all her novels. Her early work was classified as crime fiction, and she has stated she consciously chose to avoid overtones of mystery and crime in this work in order to avoid being "pigeonholed" as a mystery novelist. Station Eleven has also been discussed as "theatre-fiction".

Adaptation

In 2015, it was announced that a film adaptation of the novel was in development by Scott Steindorff.

On October 18, 2019, it was announced that Station Eleven would instead be adapted into a miniseries for HBO Max. The series premiered on December 16, 2021, with Hiro Murai directing and Patrick Somerville as showrunner and writer. Both also serve as executive producers, alongside Scott Steindorff, Scott Delman, and Dylan Russell. The miniseries stars Mackenzie Davis as Kirsten and Himesh Patel as Jeevan. Gael García Bernal portrays Arthur, and David Wilmot, Clark.

Awards
The novel won the Arthur C. Clarke Award in May 2015, beating novels including The Girl with All the Gifts and Memory of Water. The committee highlighted the novel's focus on the survival of human culture after an apocalypse, as opposed to the survival of humanity. The novel won the Toronto Book Award in October 2015.

The novel was also a finalist for the National Book Award, ultimately losing to Phil Klay's short story cycle Redeployment''. It was also a finalist for the PEN/Faulkner Award, as well as the Baileys Women's Prize for Fiction.

References

External links
 Station Eleven author's website

2014 Canadian novels
2014 science fiction novels
Novels by Emily St. John Mandel
Canadian science fiction novels
Post-apocalyptic novels
Novels set in Toronto
Novels set in Michigan
Airports in fiction
Novels about actors
Books about comics
Novels about influenza outbreaks
PEN/Faulkner Award for Fiction-winning works
Nonlinear narrative novels
Canadian novels adapted into television shows
Alfred A. Knopf books